Dilip Roy may refer to:

 Dilip Dholakia (1921–2011), Indian music composer and singer, sometimes credited as Dilip Roy
 Dilip Roy (actor) (1931–2010), Indian Bengali film actor and director
 Dilipkumar Roy (1897–1980), Indian Bengali musician, musicologist and writer